Cindy Burger (born 25 November 1992) is a Dutch former professional tennis player.

She has a career-high WTA singles ranking of No. 134, achieved on 31 October 2016. Her highest doubles ranking is 163, which she reached on 16 January 2017. In her career, Burger won seven singles and six doubles titles on the ITF Women's Circuit.

She made her WTA Tour debut at the 2015 Copa Colsanitas where she qualified for the main draw.

Burger made her first WTA Tour quarterfinal at the 2016 Rio Open where she defeated Heidi El Tabakh and Fiona Ferro in qualifying, and Christina McHale with Elitsa Kostova in the main draw. She lost to Francesca Schiavone, after failing to convert a match point.

ITF Circuit finals

Singles: 22 (7 titles, 15 runner–ups)

Doubles: 15 (6 titles, 9 runner–ups)

External links
 
 
 

1992 births
Living people
Dutch female tennis players
People from Volendam
Sportspeople from North Holland